Robert E. Lee, nicknamed the "Monarch of the Mississippi," was a steamboat built in New Albany, Indiana, in 1866 (Not to be confused with the second 1876–1882 and third 1897–1904 Robert E Lee). The hull was designed by DeWitt Hill, and the riverboat cost more than $200,000 to build. She was named for General Robert E. Lee, General in Chief of the Armies of the Confederate States. The steamboat gained its greatest fame for racing and beating the then-current speed record holder, Natchez, in an 1870 steamboat race.

Description
Its capacity was 5741 bales of cotton.

A local newspaper in New Albany described it:

The cabin and outfit of this great southern steamer surpasses that of any boat that has yet graced the trade, and her accommodations are on the same scale of grandeur and magnificence. The furniture also made to order, all of modern style and costly materials in fact solid rosewood, the chairs, sofas, sociables, etc., most artistically and elaborately carved. The cushions of all seats are heavy crimson satin, and the style of the furniture is of new and original design, all made in this city at the manufactory of John Sim. She has 20 extension dining tables in the main cabin, each to accommodate twelve guests; thus seating 240 for dinner with plenty of room for extra side tables. … The machinery of the ROB'T. E. LEE consists of feet stroke, the largest high pressure engines on the river. … The doctor is considered a triumph of the medical art, it being a new style of with the parallel motion applied. It supplies the boiler with water and can throw an immense volume. The boat is also furnished with three separate pumping fire engines with an abundance of hose to use in case of fire. … She has wrought iron shafts weighing 18,750 pounds, the shafts being each  in length, with the journals  in diameter. Each of the cranks, which are also of wrought iron, weigh 6,000 pounds. These were all made east of the Alleghenies and are the largest ever constructed for a western steamer. She also has two immense baggage rooms, all under guard. … to obviate the necessary of carrying baggage in the cabins or on guard. … The cabin with its rich garniture and splendid furniture, dazzling chandeliers, arched and fretted ceilings, etched with gold, stained glass skylights, immense mirrors, the velvet carpet, the pure zinc white of sides, the rosewood state room doors, and the imitation Egyptian marble stills, all combined to make it bear an appearance of Oriental luxury and splendor seldom conceived a never before seen floating the wild waters of this so-called semi-barbarian western world. …

History

John W. Cannon, the captain of Robert E. Lee, ensured victory by removing excess weight, carrying only a few passengers, and using prearranged barges to increase the speed of refueling. Natchez finished the race several hours later, but had been delayed by fog for six hours, and had numerous passengers to weigh it down. She received a silver bowl trophy containing the name of the Robert E. Lee. On December 22, 1870 she collided with the Potomac opposite Natchez, Mississippi. The Lee sustained much damage and was run out on a sandbar until she could be raised and repaired. 

Noted steamboat captain and historian Frederick Way, Jr., disputes this version of history somewhat. He cites Johnny Farrell, second engineer of Natchez: "This old idea about the two boats preparing for days for the race, tearing down bulkheads, putting up wind sheaves, and a lot of other stuff, is not true. When I went aboard Robert E. Lee, all they had done was to move the coal bunkers a little forward... On our boat there was absolutely no preparation whatever. There was no such thing as colors flying, bands playing, and the decks of both boats crowded with ladies and gentlemen." Way also writes that at Vicksburg, both boats took fuel flats in tow and emptied them under way.  In addition, both vessels advertised before the race that they would accept freight and passengers.

To this day no commercial boat has beaten the speed record set by Robert E. Lee during the race. However, Bogie, a 1929 motor boat built by Leroy Craft, beat Robert E. Lees record.

It usually ran between New Orleans and Natchez, Mississippi. However, during spans of bad business, it would forsake Natchez and instead go to St. Louis or Louisville, Kentucky.

Fate

She left New Orleans for Portland, Kentucky, for dismantling, mid-April, 1876, and several thousand came to see her off, with many salutes en route to mark the closing of her career. Her hull was taken to Memphis for use as a wharf boat. Much of her equipment went into her successor, also known as the second Robert E Lee (1876–1882). She carried much of the equipment and furnishings from her predecessor.

A stern wheel replica named The Lt. Robert E. Lee (as first lieutenant of engineers in 1837, the future general supervised the engineering work for St. Louis harbor) was built in 1969 based on an old Corps of Engineers hull. Moored as a floating restaurant in St. Louis, this boat was destroyed by fire in 2010. It was not a replica of the original Robert E. Lee, which was a larger side-wheel steamer.

In popular culture
 The 1910 song "Steamboat Bill" is an extended reference to the Robert E. Lee'''s race.
In 1912 Lewis F. Muir and L. Wolfe Gilbert composed the song "Waiting For The Robert E. Lee", which describes the Robert E. Lee sailing to New Orleans. It was performed by Al Jolson in the 1927 film The Jazz Singer.
The boat is mentioned in the song "The Night They Drove Old Dixie Down" by The Band. The word 'The', which indicates a reference to the steamboat, rather than the general, is unclear on the album version of the song, but is audible in the live performance on Before The Flood and more so in The Last Waltz.
The steamboat is also mentioned in the song "I wanna go back to Dixie" by Tom Lehrer.
It is also mentioned in the song by The Bellamy Brothers, "You Ain't Just Whistlin' Dixie."
The Robert E. Lee also features as a map in the Wild West first-person shooter game Fistful of Frags.
The successful Belgian Lucky Luke comic book by Morris and René Goscinny En remontant le Mississippi is a humorous depiction of the 1870 no-holds-barred race between the Robert E. Lee and Natchez steamboats (renamed respectively Abestos D. Plover and Daisy Belle) in the comic.
The famous steamboat race is mentioned in George R.R. Martin's vampires-along-the-Mississippi novel Fevre Dream.''
The race between the Robert E. Lee and Natchez is mentioned in the short story A Bear Hunt by William Faulkner, where a representation of the race is described as being on the collar of a shirt belonging to one of the characters and burnt by the cigar of another

See also
Paddle steamer
Steam yacht
Steamboats of the Mississippi

References

External links

1866 ships
New Albany, Indiana
Paddle steamers of the United States
Passenger ships of the United States
Ships built in New Albany, Indiana
Maritime incidents in September 1882